Michael Crow may refer to:

 Michael M. Crow (born 1955), 16th and current president of Arizona State University
 Michael Crow (journalist), former Scottish political journalist

See also
 Michael Crowe (disambiguation)